Marvin Isadore Knopp (January 4, 1933 – December 24, 2011) was an American mathematician who worked primarily in number theory. He made
notable contributions to the theory of modular forms.

Life and education 
Knopp was born on January 4, 1933, in Chicago, Illinois. He received his PhD under Paul T. Bateman from the University of Illinois in 1958 where he became friends with fellow student Gene Golub.
Over the course of his career, he advised twenty Ph.D. students. He is the father of pianist Seth Knopp,
and of Yehudah, Abby, and Elana.  Marvin was married to Dr. Josephine Zadovsky Knopp for 25 years but the marriage ended in divorce. Knopp died on December 24, 2011, during a vacation in Florida. Marvin found happiness from his children, old movies, great music and numbers. The last 30 years of Knopp's life was shared with Phyllis Zemble. During the 6 years following his death, Zemble organized his papers and books (with the help of Wladimer Pribitkin), his photographs and his mathematical correspondence, which she donated to the American Institute of Mathematics (AIM).  On AIM's website, you can find 131 of Knopp's reprints.

Personal life 
Knopp was born in Chicago, Illinois in 1933. He was an Ashkenazi Jew.

Career 
After receiving his PhD in 1958, Knopp taught at the University of Wisconsin and then, for a few years, at the
University of Illinois Chicago before moving, in 1976, to Temple University where he stayed until his sudden death in 2011.
Knopp was a leading expert in the theory of modular forms and a pioneering figure in the theory of Eichler cohomology, modular integrals and generalized modular forms. He was closely associated with Emil Grosswald. In Jean Dieudonne's influential book A Panorama of Pure Mathematics (Academic Press, 1982),
he is mentioned (p. 95) as one of those who "made substantial contributions" to the theory of modular forms.

Selected publications

Further reading 
  A set of papers in honor of Grosswald; includes reminiscences, list of PhD students, and a list of papers and books. Temple Tribute

References

External links 
 

American Institute of Mathematics reprints by Marvin Knopp https://aimath.org/cgi-bin/library.cgi?database=reprints;mode=display;BrowseTitle=Knopp, Marvin

20th-century American mathematicians
21st-century American mathematicians
Mathematical analysts
Number theorists
Temple University faculty
University of Illinois alumni
1933 births
2011 deaths
Mathematicians from Pennsylvania
People from Chicago
University of Wisconsin–Madison faculty
University of Illinois Chicago faculty
Mathematicians from Illinois